Stouffville District Secondary School (SDSS) is a public secondary school, and is the only secondary school located in the Town of Whitchurch–Stouffville. It is administered by the York Region District School Board.

History 
Stouffville District Secondary School officially opened in 1954. It had additions built onto the original school four times in the 1960s because its capacity was not able to maintain the pace of the population growth in the Stouffville area. The school opened its new location at Hoover Park Drive and Weldon Road in September 2007. The new location features a double gymnasium and an environmentally sustainable design. S.D.S.S is a gold certified eco-school, which includes a 24-hour control system that is used to turn down temperature and ventilation requirements during unoccupied hours. The school also has non-toxic, low-odour paints and carpeting, Energy Star-rated electrical equipment, roof and insulation materials, and an outdoor classroom.

Athletics 
Stouffville District Secondary School celebrated the first ever OFSAA victory for both girls and boys senior hockey teams in the 2006/2007 season.

The Stouffville Spartans are well known in Ontario for their success in athletics.
In OFSAA, they have won gold in:
2005-2006 A/AA Girls Hockey
2006-2007 A/AA Girls Hockey
2006-2007 A/AA Boys Hockey
2007-2008 A/AA Boys Hockey
2006-2007 A/AA Boys Rugby
2007-2008 A/AA Boys Rugby

The Spartans have also won numerous YRAA (York Region Athletic Association) titles.

See also 
List of high schools in Ontario

References

External links 
Stouffville District Secondary School

High schools in the Regional Municipality of York
Buildings and structures in Whitchurch-Stouffville
York Region District School Board
1954 establishments in Ontario
Educational institutions established in 1954